Cutts is a surname. Notable people with the name include:

 Allen S. Cutts Confederate soldier during the American Civil War
 Arthur Cutts (1879–1967), Australian politician from Tasmania
 Bill Cutts (1914–2003), Australian diplomat
 Charles Cutts (1769–1846), American politician from New Hampshire
 Dennis Cutts (born 1968), American basketball coach
 Don Cutts (born 1953), Canadian ice hockey player
 Gertrude Spurr Cutts (1858–1941), Canadian artist
 Graham Cutts (1884–1958), British film director of the 1920s
 J. E. K. Cutts (1847–1938), English church architect
 James M. Cutts (1838–1903), American soldier during the American Civil War
 Jiko Linda Cutts (born 1947), Sōtō Zen priest
 John Cutts (disambiguation), multiple people
 Luke Cutts (born 1988), British pole vaulter
Mary Cutts (1814–1846), American socialite and amateur historian 
 Oliver Cutts (1873–1939), American football player, coach, and college athletics administrator
 Marsena E. Cutts (1833–1883), American politician from Iowa
 Matt Cutts, American software developer
 Patricia Cutts (1926–1974), English film and television actress
 Richard Cutts (1771–1845), American politician from Massachusetts
 Richard Cutts (bishop), Anglican missionary in Africa and afterwards Bishop of Argentina
 Sarah Jones (née Cutts), former saxophonist in Cardiacs
 Stephen Cutts, United Nations official
 Terence John Cutts, Canadian Publican Palgrave/Toronto